"Contra vim mortis non crescit herba in hortis" ( alternatively "contra vim mortis non crescit salvia in hortis") is a Latin maxim which literally translates as "no herb grows in the gardens against the power of death" or, alternatively, "no sage grows in the gardens against the power of death." A broader meaning of the phrase is: "nothing can revert the embrace of death." The second wording, that uses salvia in place of herba, is a wordplay with the name of "salvia" (sage), which in Latin literally means "healer", or "health maker".

The saying appeared in medieval literature. Like many adages and sayings from Latin, this line is written in hexameter, the rhythmical verse typical of epic poetry in both Greek and Latin literature.

According to Jan Wielewicki in his Dziennik spraw Domu zakonnego OO. Jezuitów u św. Barbary w Krakowie, the phrase was uttered by Sigismund III Vasa on his deathbed. In Das Buch der Zitate by Gerhard Hellwig, the phrase appears in Flos medicinae.

See also
 Aphorism
 List of Latin phrases
 Memento mori

References

Cultural aspects of death
Latin philosophical phrases
Medieval literature